The 1988 Arab Club Champions Cup was played in United Arab Emirates in the city of Sharjah. Al-Ettifaq won the championship for the first time beating in the final Club Africain.

Participants

Preliminary round

Zone 1 (Gulf Area)

Kazma SC and Fanja SC advanced to the final tournament.

Zone 2 (Red Sea)

Al-Ettifaq and Al-Merrikh advanced to the final tournament.

Zone 3 (North Africa)
Preliminary round tournament held in Tunis, Tunisia.

Club Africain and KAC Marrakech advanced to the final tournament.

Zone 4 (East Region)
Preliminary round tournament held in Damascus, Syria from 4 to 10 August 1988.

Al-Shabab Baghdad and Jableh SC advanced to the final tournament.

Final tournament
Final tournament held in Sharjah, United Arab Emirates from 21 October to 4 November 1988.

Group stage

Group A

Group B

Knockout stage

Semi-finals

Third place match

Final

Winners

References

External links
6th Arab Club Champions Cup 1988 - rsssf.com

UAFA Club Cup, 1988
UAFA Club Cup, 1988
1988